Raag Kapur (born 22 February 1999) is a Hong Kong cricketer. In September 2019, he was named in Hong Kong's Twenty20 International (T20I) squads for the 2019–20 Oman Pentangular Series and the 2019 ICC T20 World Cup Qualifier tournament in the United Arab Emirates. He made his T20I debut for Hong Kong, against Nepal, on 6 October 2019.

References

External links
 

1999 births
Living people
Hong Kong cricketers
Hong Kong Twenty20 International cricketers
Place of birth missing (living people)